James Hogg was a Scottish footballer who played as a right half.

Career
Hogg played club football for Ayr United, and made one appearance for Scotland in 1922.

References

Year of birth missing
Place of birth missing
Scottish footballers
Scotland international footballers
Ayr United F.C. players
Association football wing halves
Year of death missing
Place of death missing